KB Financial Group Inc. is a financial holding company headquartered in Seoul, South Korea. The Group and its subsidiaries provide a broad range of banking and financial services. It is one of the domestic systemically important banks (D-SIBs) identified by the Financial Services Commission.

History 
KB Financial Group was established through restructuring Kookmin Bank into a holding company in September 2008. Kookmin Bank launched a financial holding firm to boost non-banking operations such as brokerage, insurance, and consumer finance. After the establishment, KB has acquired non-banking financial services companies, including LIG Insurance, Hyundai Securities, Prudential Life Korea, etc.

In 2015, KB acquired LIG Insurance, South Korea's fourth-largest non-life insurance company with assets totaling 24 trillion won, from LIG Group and changed its name to KB Insurance. KB also took over Hyundai Securities from Hyundai Group after beating Korea Investment and Hong Kong-based private equity firm Actis in 2016. KB has merged its existing stock brokerage firm KB Investment & Securities with Hyundai Securities and renamed as KB Securities. In 2020, KB reinforced the life insurance business by acquiring a 100% stake in Prudential Financial Inc's South Korean unit for 2.3 trillion won.

In 2021, KB Financial Group brought out majority stakes on Indonesia-based Bank Bukopin and rebranding their company name as KB Bukopin.

Operations 
There are 13 subsidiaries under KB Financial Group, including Kookmin Bank, KB Securities, KB Insurance, KB Kookmin Card, Prudential Life Insurance Korea, KB Asset Management, KB Capital, KB Life Insurance, KB Real Estate Trust, KB Savings Bank, KB Investment, KB Data Systems, and KB Credit Information.

See also 
 Uijeongbu KB Insurance Stars

References

External links 
 

 
Companies based in Seoul
South Korean brands
Companies listed on the Korea Exchange
South Korean companies established in 2008
Financial services companies of South Korea